Parashakthi Temple, also known as Divine Mother Temple in the west for Devi Adi Parasakti worshipers situated in the heart of Pontiac, Michigan, United States. The Temple was built in 1999 and the inaugural pooja took place on Vijayadasami day.

Mission statement
To share Divine Mother's grace with humanity so that they can explore and experience the Divine.

Main deity: Devi Parasakthi
Divine Mother is "Divine Consciousness" manifested as Shiva Shakthi and formed a Nada Bindu (sound and spiritual light), which separated into Shiva and Shakthi. All the gods and goddesses are her manifestations of various vibratory divine entities. At Parashakthi Temple, she is present as Parashakthi Karumari Ambika who is closest to the earthly creations. Devi Parashakthi is  Kundalini Shakthi, which manifested as Prakrti (Shakthi), which together with Purusha (Shiva) has materialized into various universes (multiverse) as living and non-living entities through maya (illusion) Shakthi.

The Mother Parashakthi Sanctum (Sannidhi) is also graced by the presence of the Maha Meru which RajaRajeswari/ Bhuvaneswari to this Sannidhi. Further, on the same pedestal, there is Goddess Raja Matangi, Devi Varahi Ambika, and Devi Bhuvaneshwari.

Major festivals
Devi Navaratri (Dasara) is the major function celebrating the Mother. This is celebrated on nine consecutive nights in the Month of Aswayujam starting on the 1st phase and ending on the 10th phase of waxing Moon. This function depicts how the Mother manifested Herself as Durga, Lakshmi, and Saraswathi.

Temple Fire Incident
The Temple caught on major fire on April 21, 2018. The flame broke out in the temple after ember was from memorial firebox and set fire to the roof. Deputies sent people to the roof to evacuate them and they succeeded. About 30 people who were inside the temple during the fire were evacuated. The elder of the temple said that the cause of the fire was ember

Under construction 

Temple is closed because renovation which caused by fire. The Temple will open next year because waiting for government approved

References

External links
 Major Temple Fire IncidentFree Press

Hindu temples in Michigan
1999 establishments in Michigan
Buildings and structures in Oakland County, Michigan
Religious buildings and structures completed in 1999